John Edwin Hummel (April 4, 1883 – May 18, 1959) born in Bloomsburg, Pennsylvania, was a Utility player for the Brooklyn Superbas/Brooklyn Dodgers/Brooklyn Robins (1905–15) and New York Yankees (1918). He attended college at Bloomsburg University of Pennsylvania.

In 1161 games over 12 seasons, Hummel posted a .254 batting average (991-for-3906) with 421 runs, 128 doubles, 84 triples, 29 home runs, 394 RBIs, 119 stolen bases, 346 bases on balls, .316 on-base percentage and .352 slugging percentage. He finished his career with a .969 fielding percentage playing at all three outfield positions and first base, second base and shortstop.

Sources

1883 births
1959 deaths
People from Bloomsburg, Pennsylvania
Baseball players from Pennsylvania
Major League Baseball first basemen
Major League Baseball second basemen
Major League Baseball left fielders
Major League Baseball right fielders
Binghamton Triplets managers
Bloomsburg Huskies baseball players
Brooklyn Superbas players
Brooklyn Dodgers players
Brooklyn Robins players
New York Yankees players
Holyoke Paperweights players
Buffalo Bisons (minor league) players
San Francisco Seals (baseball) players
Reading Coal Barons players
Reading Marines players
Springfield Ponies players
Wheeling Stogies players